The following is a list of amphibians found in the state of Arizona. The Arizona tree frog is the state amphibian. The state is home to three salamander species.

Arizona is home to a wide variety of biotic systems as it is diverse topographically, geologically, and climatically. The area's sporadic mountains create "sky islands", wherein varying altitudes create drastically different environments inhabited by specific species. For example, the eastern barking frog is only found at altitudes of 1,280–1,890 m on Arizonan mountains. Although the state is mostly arid, river systems such as the Colorado River provide riparian habitats.

List of species

Order Anura

Family Bufonidae
Bufonidae is a family of toads, often called the "true toads". Although a widely varied family, Bufonidae includes the stereotypical toad: dry warty skin and shortened forelimbs and hindlimbs. Bufonids also carry potent skin toxins, sometimes concentrated in the parotoid gland.

Family Hylidae
Hylidae is a family of frogs which are commonly found in the New World. They may be better known as tree frogs.

Family Leptodactylidae

Family Microhylidae
Microhylidae is a family of frogs. They can often be identified by their tear-dropped shape, hence the common name "narrow-mouthed frogs".

Family Ranidae
Ranidae, true frogs, are the largest family of frogs. Members of this family, called Ranids, typically have robust hindlimbs, toe webbing, and an aquatic tadpole stage.

Family Scaphiopodidae
Scaphiopodidae are a family of frogs. Commonly called spadefoot frogs, they are often inconspicuously coloured. Members of this family are predominantly fossorial, living underground until rain arrives. To aid in digging, they have keratinized protrusions on their feet.

Order Urodela

Family Ambystomatidae

Notes and references

Notes

References

Arizona
Amphibians